Events from the year 1801 in the United States.

Incumbents

Federal Government 
 President: John Adams (F-Massachusetts) (until March 4), Thomas Jefferson (DR-Virginia) (starting March 4)
 Vice President: Thomas Jefferson (DR-Virginia) (until March 4), Aaron Burr (DR-New York) (starting March 4)
 Chief Justice: John Marshall (Virginia)
 Speaker of the House of Representatives: Theodore Sedgwick (F-Massachusetts) (until March 4), Nathaniel Macon (DR-North Carolina) (starting December 7)
 Congress: 6th (until March 4), 7th (starting March 4)

Events
 January 10 – John Adams appoints William Henry Harrison as the first Governor of the Indiana Territory.
 January 31 – John Marshall is appointed Chief Justice of the United States.
 February – Contingent election of 1801: An electoral tie between Thomas Jefferson and Aaron Burr is resolved, when Jefferson is elected President of the United States and Burr Vice President by the United States House of Representatives.
 February 27 – Washington, D.C. is placed under the jurisdiction of the Congress of the United States.
 March 4 – Thomas Jefferson is sworn in as the third President of the United States, and Aaron Burr is sworn in as Vice President of the United States.
 May 10 – The First Barbary War begins as the pasha of Tripoli declares war on the United States by having the flagpole on the consulate chopped down.
 July – Eli Whitney demonstrates before Congress the advantages of the system of interchangeable parts in the manufacture of firearms.
 August 1 – Action of 1 August 1801 (First Barbary War): United States Navy schooner  captures the 14-gun Tripolitan corsair polacca Tripoli off the north African coast in a single-ship action.
 November 16 – The first edition of New York Evening Post is printed.
 Jefferson, the first American yacht, is built in Salem, Massachusetts, for George Crowninshield Jr.

Ongoing
 First Barbary War (1801–1805)

Births
 January 20 – Thomas Hickman Williams, United States Senator from Mississippi from 1838 till 1839. (died 1851)
 March 27 – Alexander Barrow, United States Senator from Louisiana from 1841 till 1846. (died 1846)
 April 26 – Ambrose Dudley Mann, first United States Assistant Secretary of State (died 1889)
 May 6 – George S. Greene, Union Army general (died 1899)
 May 16 – William H. Seward, United States Secretary of State from 1861 to 1869 (died 1872)
 June 1 – Brigham Young, leader in the Latter Day Saint movement (died 1877)
 July 5 – David Farragut, flag officer of the United States Navy during the American Civil War (died 1870)
 June 14 – Heber C. Kimball, religious leader (died 1868)
 June 15 – Benjamin Wright Raymond, 3rd Mayor of Chicago (died 1883)
 August 10 – Robert Woodward Barnwell, United States Senator from South Carolina from 1862 till 1865. (died 1882)
 August 31 – Pierre Soule, United States Senator from Louisiana in 1847 and from 1849 till 1853. (died 1870)
 September 10 – 
 Garrett Davis, United States Senator from Kentucky from 1861 till 1872. (died 1872)
 Marie Laveau, Voodoo Queen of New Orleans, (died 1881)
 November 4 – Ambrose Hundley Sevier, United States Senator from Arkansas from 1836 till 1848. (died 1848)
 November 9 – Gail Borden, surveyor, newspaper publisher, and inventor of condensed milk (died 1874)
 November 10 – Samuel Gridley Howe, physician, abolitionist (died 1876)
 December 28 – James Barnes, Union Army general (died 1869)
 Date Unknown – Solomon W. Downs, United States Senator from Louisiana from 1847 till 1853. (died 1854)

Deaths
 January 9 – Margaretta Faugères, playwright, poet and political activist (born 1771)
 February 6 – Annis Boudinot Stockton, poet and sponsor of literary salons (born 1736 )
 February 23 – Elizabeth Graeme Fergusson, poet and sponsor of literary salons (born 1737)
 March 14 – Margarita "Peggy" Schuyler, youngest child of Philip Schuyler (born 1758)
 June 4 – Frederick Muhlenberg, first Speaker of the House of Representatives (born 1750)
 June 14 – Benedict Arnold, Revolutionary hero and traitor (born 1741)
 September 10 – Jason Fairbanks, murderer (born 1780)
 November 4 – William Shippen, physician and Continental Congressman (born 1712)
 November 23 – Philip Hamilton, first son of Alexander Hamilton and Elizabeth Schuyler Hamilton, (fatally shot by George Eacker in a duel at age 19) (born 1782)

See also
Timeline of United States history (1790–1819)

Further reading
 A. P. C. Griffin. Issues of the District of Columbia Press in 1800, 1801, 1802. Records of the Columbia Historical Society, Washington, D.C., Vol. 4, (1901), pp. 32–74
 John Marshall on the Judiciary, the Republicans, and Jefferson, March 4, 1801. The American Historical Review, Vol. 53, No. 3 (April, 1948), pp. 518–520
 Dorothy MacKay Quynn. Dangers of Subversion in an American Education: A French View, 1801. The Catholic Historical Review, Vol. 39, No. 1 (April, 1953), pp. 28–35
 Bennard B. Perlman. Baltimore Mansion, 1801–03. Journal of the Society of Architectural Historians, Vol. 14, No. 1 (March, 1955), pp. 26–28.
 Carroll W. Pursell, Jr. E. I. du Pont, Don Pedro, and the Introduction of Merino Sheep into the United States, 1801: A Document. Agricultural History, Vol. 33, No. 2 (April, 1959), pp. 86–88
 Donald R. Hickey. The United States Army versus Long Hair: The Trials of Colonel Thomas Butler, 1801–1805. The Pennsylvania Magazine of History and Biography, Vol. 101, No. 4 (October, 1977), pp. 462–474
 Albert E. Van Dusen. "Eli Whitney". Laptop Encyclopedia of Connecticut History. CTHeritage.org, 2003. Retrieved December 24, 2011.
 John W. Wagner. New York City Concert Life, 1801-5. American Music, Vol. 2, No. 2 (Summer, 1984), pp. 53–69

External links
 

 
1800s in the United States
United States
United States
Years of the 19th century in the United States